Neill Roberts is a retired South Africa soccer forward who spent six seasons in the North American Soccer League and four in the Major Indoor Soccer League.

Roberts spent seven years as a professional in South Africa.  In 1979, Roberts signed during the season with the Atlanta Chiefs of the North American Soccer League and promptly scored fourteen goals in nineteen games.  During the offseason, the Tampa Bay Rowdies purchased his contract from the Chiefs.  However, his goal production dropped with the Rowdies.  He played the 1980 and 1981 outdoor seasons with the Rowdies, scoring twelve goals in fifty-three games.  Following the 1981-1982 indoor season, the Rowdies sent him to the Edmonton Drillers.  Roberts began the 1982 season in Edmonton before being sent to the Toronto Blizzard in June.  He was the league's 6th leading scorer in 1982 with 42 points in 12 games.  Before the 1984 season, the Rowdies acquired Roberts.  He was the 15th leading scorer in 1984 with 23 points in 23 games. He was the league's 24th all-time leading scorer with 156 points in 143 career games.  At the end of the 1984 outdoor season, the Rowdies sold Robert's contract to the Chicago Sting as the Sting prepared to enter the Major Indoor Soccer League.  The move to the Sting also saw Roberts move to the backline as Chicago coach Willy Roy converted Roberts to a defender.  On 1 March 1986, the Sting sold Roberts contract to the Wichita Wings for $30,000. The Wings released him at the end of the season.  In November 1987, Roberts signed as a free agent with the Minnesota Strikers.  The Strikers released him in 1988.  In 1990, he joined the newly established, independent amateur club, the Minnesota Thunder.

Roberts currently coaches the U-11 (Mutiny) boys team of F.C. Tampa youth soccer organization in Tampa, Florida.

References

External links
 NASL/MISL stats

1954 births
Living people
Sportspeople from Durban
South African people of British descent
American Soccer League (1933–1983) players
Atlanta Chiefs players
Chicago Sting (MISL) players
Edmonton Drillers (1979–1982) players
Eredivisie players
Expatriate footballers in the Netherlands
Expatriate soccer players in Canada
Expatriate soccer players in the United States
FC Amsterdam players
Major Indoor Soccer League (1978–1992) players
Minnesota Thunder players
North American Soccer League (1968–1984) indoor players
North American Soccer League (1968–1984) players
Sacramento Gold (1976–1980) players
South African expatriate soccer players
South African expatriate sportspeople in Canada
South African expatriate sportspeople in the Netherlands
South African expatriate sportspeople in the United States
South African soccer players
Tampa Bay Rowdies (1975–1993) players
Toronto Blizzard (1971–1984) players
Wichita Wings (MISL) players
White South African people
Association football defenders
Association football forwards